The 2014 Taça de Portugal Final was the final match of the 2013–14 Taça de Portugal, the 74th season of the Taça de Portugal, the premier Portuguese football cup competition organized by the Portuguese Football Federation (FPF).

The final took place on 18 May 2014 at the Estádio Nacional in Oeiras. It was played between Benfica and Rio Ave, the two teams who also contested the 2014 Taça da Liga Final. Benfica won the Taça de Portugal for a record 25th time and made its 10th double (a record) and also an unprecedented treble by winning the Primeira Liga, Taça da Liga and Taça de Portugal.

Rio Ave qualified for the 2014–15 UEFA Europa League by reaching the final, as Benfica had already qualified for the Champions League via their Primeira Liga result. This was the last season in which cup runners-up qualify for the Europa League if the winner had already qualified for the Champions League. As Benfica won the 2013–14 Primeira Liga, Rio Ave played against them in the 2014 Supertaça Cândido de Oliveira as the Taça de Portugal representative.

Match

Details

References

2014
2013–14 in Portuguese football
S.L. Benfica matches
Rio Ave F.C. matches